Tim Dwyer may refer to:
 Tim Dwyer (rugby league), Australian rugby league player
 Tim Dwyer (basketball), American basketball player and coach

See also
 Horse MacGyver (Timothy Dwyer), Australian artist and electronic musician